Gwendoline Taylor (born 2 November 1987) is a New Zealand actress. She first appeared on screen in 2007 in Show of Hands, which was filmed in her hometown of New Plymouth. In 2008, Gwendoline moved to Auckland to study post-production at South Seas Film & Television School, where her tutors insisted that she belonged in front of the camera. In 2012, she was cast as Sibyl in Spartacus: War of the Damned, a television series on the Starz network. She has made a number of appearances in short films and on the series Go Girls and Nothing Trivial. Her other film credits include a featured role as Emily in Sione's 2: Unfinished Business, the sequel to the NZ smash hit Sione's Wedding. In 2015 she was cast as Angelica in the New Zealand film Someone to Carry Me.

References

External links

21st-century New Zealand actresses
New Zealand actresses
Living people
1987 births